The 80th Scripps National Spelling Bee was held on May 30–31, 2007.

The winner was 13-year-old Evan O'Dorney from Danville, California. He won in Round 13 by correctly spelling serrefine. The runner-up was Nate Gartke from Edmonton, Alberta, Canada who misspelled coryza.

There were 286 spellers this year, 139 boys and 147 girls. Fifty-nine survived the first day. By lunchtime of day two, it was down to 33, and 15 by 2 pm. Andrew Lay's correct spelling of "negus" and surprised response became a popular video snippet. The showdown began between O’Dorney and Gartke when both contestants were the last to survive correctly spelling 7 consecutive words each.

The first place prize was $50,000 in cash, and additional prizes from Scripps.

The championship finals aired live on ABC from 8:00 PM to shortly after 10:00 p.m. EDT.

Word list championship round

References

External links
 Video - Andrew Lay spells "negus" at 2007 bee
 Video - Pronouncer Jacques Bailly on 2007 bee
 Video - Commercial promo for 2007 bee

Scripps National Spelling Bee competitions
2007 in American television
2000s American television specials
Scripps National Spelling Bee
2007 in education
May 2007 events in the United States